Scirea is an Italian surname. Notable people with the surname include:

Gaetano Scirea (1953–1989), Italian footballer
 (born 1949), Italian politician
Mario Scirea (born 1964), Italian cyclist

Italian-language surnames